There are remarkably few Bible translations into Swedish that have been made before the last two centuries. The Latin common Bible is known to have been used by the Catholic Church during the Christian part of the middle ages, but at least paraphrases in Swedish of some parts of the Bible were made at the time. However, no complete translation has been preserved, and the earliest, certainly known, complete Bible was not made until the Reformation, on commission by Gustav Vasa.

Translations before the Reformation 

Despite there are archeological evidence of Christian cult in Varnhem, Västergötland, from the 9th century, and that at least parts of Sweden became organized by the Catholic Church in the early 11th century, there are no sources supporting written translations of any parts of the Bible until the 14th century.

Magnus Eriksson's and Saint Birgitta's Bibles 

The earliest mentions of a Swedish Bible is note in an inventory list for Magnus IV of Sweden, where a "big volume Bible in Swedish" is listed. A similar note is made for Bridget of Sweden.

The Pentateuch Paraphrase 

Pentateuchparafrasen, the Pentateuch Paraphrase, is a famous manuscript from the 1330s. It is a paraphrase on the five books of Moses, and also contains a slightly shortened variant of Acts of the Apostles. It exists today in one complete copy, Codex Holmiensis A 1 (MBIB) from 1526, stored in National Library of Sweden, and one almost complete copy, Codex Thott 4 (MBIA) from 1400–1450, stored in Copenhagen.

It is possible that both the Bibles of Magnus IV and Bridget of Sweden were either the original Pentateuch Paraphrase, or copies of it. According to the sources, it is possible that Bridget had a translation made, that became a paraphrase, and that she later gave it to the king, or the queen.

Translations in the late middle ages 

A few other translations are known from the 15th century:

 The Book of Joshua. Translated by Nicolaus Ragvaldi. Part of Codex Holmiensis A 1.
 The Book of Judges. Translated by Nicolaus Ragvaldi. Part of Codex Holmiensis A 1.
 The Book of Judith. Translated by Jöns Budde. Part of Codex Holmiensis A 1.
 The Book of Esther. Translated  by Jöns Budde. Part of Codex Holmiensis A 1.
 The Book of Ruth. Translated  by Jöns Budde. Part of Codex Holmiensis A 1.
 1 Maccabees. Translated  by Jöns Budde. Part of Codex Holmiensis A 1.
 2 Maccabees. Translated  by Jöns Budde. Part of Codex Holmiensis A 1.
 The Book of Revelation. Unknown translator. Part of Codex Holmiensis A 1.
 Gospel of Nicodemus. Unknown translator. Part of Codex Holmiensis A 3.

Translations used by the Church of Sweden 

 Gustav Vasa Bible: A translation commissioned by Gustav Vasa, published in 1526 (New Testament) and 1541 (complete Bible). Published shortly after Martin Luther's translation into german (New Testament 1522, and complete Bible 1534).
 Gustav II Adolf Bible: a revision of the Gustav Vasa Bible with verses, published 1618. 
 Charles XII Bible: ordered by Charles XII of Sweden, published in 1703, a slight revision of Gustav Vasa's
 1917 års bibelöversättning, (1917 Bible translation) much revised but still with a slightly antiquated language
 Bibel 2000: the latest official state church translation, including the Old Testament and Apocrypha

Other Swedish translations 

 Bible translations from 1536, limited edition of four books of the Old Testament and the Apocrypha
 Normalupplagan (Normal Version)
 Helge Åkessons översättning, (Helge Akesson's Translation) by the Baptist translator Helge Åkesson, 1911
 Nya Världens Översättning (New World Bible Translation): by the Jehovah's Witnesses, latest revision 2017.
 David Hedegårds översättning (David Hedegard's Translation): New Testament only
 Bo Giertz översättning (Bo Giertz Translation): New Testament only
 Svenska folkbibeln (Swedish People's Bible)
 Levande Bibeln (Living Bible): completed in September 2000, by the International Bible Society
 NuBibeln (Swedish Contemporary Bible; NUB), 2015, by Biblica, Inc.
 Reformationsbibeln (Reformation Bible) – New Testament only
 Darby Bible – New Testament only; by Taylor Exclusive Brethren, principal work done by Eric Carrén

Comparison

See also 

 Swedish Bible Society

References

External links

 Pentateuch Paraphrase downloadable as PDF, at the World Digital Library.
 Karl XII Bibel PDF's
 Full text of Svenska 1917
 Full text of Folkbibeln
 Full text of Bibel 2000
 Full text of Levande Bibeln

 
Swedish literature